Louise Jöhncke (born 31 July 1976) is a former freestyle swimmer from Sweden, who competed for her native country at two consequentive Summer Olympics, starting in 1996. Her biggest successes came on short course (25 m); she won the world title as a member of the Swedish relay Team in the 4 × 200 m freestyle at the 1999 FINA World Swimming Championships (25 m) in Hong Kong, China. A year later, at 2000 FINA World Swimming Championships (25 m) in Athens, Greece, she captured the title in the 4 × 100 m freestyle.

References

External links
 Profile on FINA site

1976 births
Living people
Swimmers at the 1996 Summer Olympics
Swimmers at the 2000 Summer Olympics
Olympic swimmers of Sweden
Olympic bronze medalists for Sweden
Swimmers from Stockholm
Olympic bronze medalists in swimming
Swedish female freestyle swimmers
Medalists at the FINA World Swimming Championships (25 m)
European Aquatics Championships medalists in swimming
Järfälla SS swimmers
Väsby SS swimmers
Spårvägens SF swimmers
Södertörns SS swimmers
Medalists at the 2000 Summer Olympics